Günther's vole (Microtus guentheri) is a species of rodent in the family Cricetidae, also known by the name Levant vole.
It is found in Bulgaria, Greece, Iran, Iraq, Israel, Jordan, Lebanon, North Macedonia, Serbia and Montenegro, Syria, Turkey, and Libya.  In Libya, its natural habitats are temperate grassland, subtropical or tropical high-altitude grassland, and arable land. In Israel, it is common in lowland agricultural fields, in peak years becoming a major crop pest.

References

Musser, G. G. and M. D. Carleton. 2005. Superfamily Muroidea. pp. 894–1531 in Mammal Species of the World: a Taxonomic and Geographic Reference. D. E. Wilson and D. M. Reeder eds. Johns Hopkins University Press, Baltimore.
 Schlitter, D. 2004.  Microtus guentheri.   2008 IUCN Red List of Threatened Species.   Downloaded on 26 July 2014.

Gunther's
Vole, Gunther's
Mammals described in 1880
Taxonomy articles created by Polbot